The 2010–11 Odense Boldklub season was the club's 123th season, and their 50th appearance in the Danish Superliga. As well as the Superliga, they competed in the Ekstra Bladet Cup.

First team 

Last updated on 31 May 2011

Transfers and loans

Transfers in

Competitions

Superliga

Results summary

Result by round

League table

Matches

UEFA Europa League

Third qualifying round 

Odense won 5–3 on aggregate

Play-off round 

Odense won 3–1 on aggregate

Group stage

References 

Odense Boldklub seasons